Alok Kumar is a Bhojpuri actor and singer. Alok Kumar was the winner of the first season of Mahuaa TV's "Sur Sangram". He debuted as an actor in the film Kahiya Biyah Bola Karba with Rinku Ghosh.

Alok Kumar was born on 9 February 1984 in Patna, Bihar. Alok is a popular singer in Uttar Pradesh, Madhya Pradesh, Bihar and Jharkhand. He has worked in many blockbuster movies, including Kahiya Biyah Bola Karba and others.

Career
Alok started his career as a contestant on the Bhojpuri singing reality show "Sur Sangram", hosted by Mahuaa TV.

Filmography

Discography

References

Living people
Male actors in Bhojpuri cinema
Singers from Bihar
Male actors from Bihar
Indian male playback singers
21st-century Indian male actors
1986 births